is a crossover fighting video game developed by Bitstep and published by Hudson for the GameCube and PlayStation 2 in Japan on December 18, 2003. The game features characters from Hudson and Konami's video game series and Takara's toy lines.

Gameplay
DreamMix TV is a platform fighter, in which up to four player-controlled characters move around a 2D arena and attempt to defeat their opponents. Each character can perform a series of basic attacks and one or two unique special moves. Characters can also throw their opponents, guard and dodge to avoid damage, or cling to hanging bars to evade opponents. The game revolves around damaging opponents by causing them to lose coins that represent their remaining life. A meter at the bottom of the screen indicates how much life characters have remaining. If a player loses all of their coins, they will enter a Super Pinch state, in which their character shrinks in size and their soul flies around the stage. If an opponent retrieves the soul before the player character can, the player character is knocked out, though they can still move around the stage in shrunken form to interfere with the remaining characters. The last character standing at the end of the round wins. The game offers 15 stages on which to battle based on various franchises, such as Big Shell, Adventure Island, Floating Continent and Devastator. Some stages offer occasional hazards that will disrupt battle and inflict additional damage, such as floating Medusa heads in Dracula's Castle.

The primary single player campaign is World Fighters, an arcade mode with interstitial story cutscenes. In the story, the fledgling World Fighters television program has been suffering from poor audience approval and is on the verge of being cancelled by the DreamMix TV network. To prevent this, hosts Mujoe and Haruna invite various superstars from differing realities to compete on the show in order to increase ratings. Players must win six battles against a pre-determined series of opponents before entering a final battle with Mujoe. The show's ratings will increase and decrease during these battles based on the player's performance; if the ratings reach 0%, the player immediately loses. Players are ranked from D to A based on their average ratings at the end of the campaign. New characters and stages are unlocked by completing World Fighters with specific characters. The game also features Character Soul Survival, a standard multiplayer battle mode for up to four players; Caravan mode, which offers several score-based challenges; and a Library section for viewing unlockable character and stage profiles.

Playable characters
DreamMix TV offers 17 playable characters originating from various video game and toy franchises created by Hudson Soft, Konami and Takara. In addition to the playable characters, recurring Bomberman villain Mujoe appears in the story as one of the World Fighters hosts and as the game's final boss, aided by his Hige-Hige Bandits. An original character named Haruna acts as the announcer during gameplay, and appears in story mode cutscenes as Mujoe's co-host.

Reception

Notes

References

External links

IGN profile

2003 video games
Crossover fighting games
GameCube games
Hudson Soft games
Japan-exclusive video games
Konami games
Multiplayer and single-player video games
PlayStation 2 games
RenderWare games
Platform fighters
Takara video games
Transformers video games
Video games developed in Japan